Tanbar may refer to:

 Tanbar Station, a pastoral lease in Queensland, Australia
 Tanbar, Queensland, an outback locality in the Shire of Barcoo, Queensland, Australia